Kjell Allan Sjöberg (11 May 1937 – 10 September 2013) was a Swedish ski jumper.

Career
He competed at the 1960, 1964 and 1968 Olympics in the normal hill and large hill events with the best result of fifth place in the large hill in 1964.

He set two world records, 141 metres (464 ft) in 1964 and 148 metres (486 ft) in 1967, both on Heini-Klopfer-Skiflugschanze ski flying hill in Oberstdorf, West Germany.

He won a bronze medal in that event at the 1966 FIS Nordic World Ski Championships in Oslo.

After retiring from competitions Sjöberg worked in the paint and paper production industries. He died aged 76 and was survived by wife Astrid, daughter Marie, two brothers and a sister.

Ski jumping world records

References

External links

1937 births
2013 deaths
People from Örnsköldsvik Municipality
Swedish male ski jumpers
Ski jumpers at the 1960 Winter Olympics
Ski jumpers at the 1964 Winter Olympics
Ski jumpers at the 1968 Winter Olympics
FIS Nordic World Ski Championships medalists in ski jumping
Olympic ski jumpers of Sweden
Sportspeople from Västernorrland County